ST2 may refer to:

 Ducati ST2, an Italian sport touring motorcycle
 ST2, the postcode district of the ST postcode area covering Bentilee, Abbey Hulton, and Bucknall
 ST2 cardiac biomarker, a novel biomarker of cardiac stress
 Sound Transit 2, a joint ballot measure to expand & improve Washington state's Puget Sound public transport system
 Star Trek II: The Wrath of Khan, a 1982 American science fiction film released by Paramount Pictures
 Star Trek Into Darkness, a 2013 film 
 Starship Troopers 2: Hero of the Federation, second film in the Starship Troopers film series
 Zoda's Revenge: StarTropics II, a video game released only in North America in 1994
 ST-2, a telecommunications satellite in geosynchronous orbit, launched in 2011

See also
 2ST, radio station in NSW, Australia
 2nd Street (disambiguation)
 STII (disambiguation)
 STT (disambiguation)
 STST (disambiguation)